Nemanja Radulović (born 18 October 1985), is a Serbian violinist.

Biography
Radulović began studying the violin in 1992. In 1996, he was awarded the October Prize for music of the city of Belgrade, and in the following year, he received the Special Prize from the Serbian Ministry of Education for "Talent 1997". He continued his musical studies in 1998 at the Hochschule für Musik Saar in Saarbrücken with Joshua Epstein, and in 1999, at the University of Arts in Belgrade, with Dejan Mihailović. At the age of fourteen, he moved to France to study with Patrice Fontanarosa at the Conservatoire de Paris.

In 2006, on short notice, he replaced Maxim Vengerov in the Beethoven Concerto with the Orchestre Philharmonique de Radio France and Myung-Whun Chung at the Salle Pleyel. Since then, he has performed as an international soloist with the two chamber ensembles he founded, The Devil's Trills and Double Sens. He performs regularly with the harpist Marielle Nordmann and the pianists Laure Favre-Kahn, Dominique Plancade and Susan Manoff. He is closely associated with the Festival des Nuits Romantiques. Radulović plays on an 1843 violin by Jean-Baptiste Vuillaume.

Awards and honours
 1996 – October Prize, City of Belgrade
 1997 – "Talent of the Year", Serbian Ministry of Education
 1998 – Fifth Prize, International Violin Competition, "Rodolfo Price Lipizer"
2001 - Winner of Stradivarius violin competition, Cremona, Italy
2001 - 1st prize & Winner of George Enescu International Competition, special prize for the interpretation of 3rd Enescu sonata. Bucharest, Romania
 2003 – First Prize, International Violin Competition,  Hannover
 2005 – "International Revelation of the Year", Victoires classical music
 2006 – "Rising Star", 2006/2007
 2014 – "Soloist instrumental", Victoires classical music
 2017 – Order of Karađorđe's Star
2017 - Chevalier des arts et des lettres, French national title

Discography
 2006 – Pièces pour violon seul (Transart Live)
 2008 – Mendelssohn, Concertos pour violon 1 et 2 (Transart Live)
 2009 – Les trilles du diable (Decca)
 2010 – Beethoven, Sonates pour violon et piano 5, 7 et 8, avec Susan Manoff, piano (Decca)
 2011 – Les cinq saisons (les quatre saisons de Vivaldi et "Spring in Japan", composition originale d'Alexander Sedlar) (Decca)
 2013 – Après un rêve, avec Marielle Nordmann (Transart)
 2013 – Paganini Fantasy (Deutsche Grammophon)
 2014 – Carnets de Voyage (Deutsche Grammophon)
 2014 – Journey East (Deutsche Grammophon)
 2016 – Bach (Deutsche Grammophon)
 2017 – Tchaikovsky: Violin concerto – Rococo Variations (Deutsche Grammophon)
 2018 – Baïka (Deutsche Grammophon)
 2020 – Essentials (Deutsche Grammophon)
 2022 - Roots (Catalogue Marketing Classique/Warer Classics)

References

External links
Official Website

1985 births
Living people
Serbian violinists
Serbian emigrants to France
Conservatoire de Paris alumni
21st-century violinists